Tony Vincent Johnson (born February 5, 1972) is a former American football tight end who played for four seasons in the National Football League (NFL). He played for the New Orleans Saints from 1996 to 1999. He was drafted by the Philadelphia Eagles in the sixth round of the 1996 NFL Draft, but did not make the team. He played college football at Alabama. 

Johnson now resides in Knoxville, Tennessee.

References

1972 births
Living people
American football tight ends
Alabama Crimson Tide football players
Philadelphia Eagles players
Players of American football from Mississippi
New Orleans Saints players
People from Como, Mississippi